Escape from the Hidden Castle (also called Midnight Party) is a board game published in 1989 by Ravensburger / Fisher-Price.

Gameplay
Escape from the Hidden Castle is a game in which each player controls guests trying to escape a ghost's birthday party, while the ghost tries to capture them and put them in the wine cellar.

Reception
George Crawshay reviewed Midnight Party for Games International magazine, and gave it a rating of 7 out of 10, and stated that "Not one to shake the world, but certainly recommended for some light hearted entertainment."

References

External links
Review in Games

Board games introduced in 1989
Ravensburger games